Boleszkowice  (German Karlshöhe) is a village in the administrative district of Gmina Grzmiąca, in Szczecinek County, West Pomeranian Voivodeship, Poland.

The village has a population of 60.

See also
History of Pomerania

References

Boleszkowice